The year 2008 is the 7th year in the history of the Cage Rage Championships, a mixed martial arts promotion based in the United Kingdom. In 2008 Cage Rage Championships held 9 events, Cage Rage Contenders 8.

Title fights

Events list

Cage Rage Contenders 8

Cage Rage Contenders 8 was an event held on February 2, 2008 at The Troxy in London, United Kingdom.

Results

Cage Rage 25

Cage Rage 25 was an event held on March 8, 2008 at Wembley Arena in London, United Kingdom.

Results

Cage Rage Contenders 9

Cage Rage Contenders 9 was an event held on April 12, 2008 at The Troxy in London, United Kingdom.

Results

Cage Rage Contenders - Ireland vs. Belgium

Cage Rage Contenders - Ireland vs. Belgium was an event held on May 3, 2008 at National Stadium in Dublin, Ireland.

Results

Cage Rage 26

Cage Rage 26 was an event held on May 10, 2008 at NEC Arena in Birmingham, United Kingdom.

Results

Cage Rage Contenders 10

Cage Rage Contenders 10 was an event held on June 14, 2008 at The Troxy in London, United Kingdom.

Results

Cage Rage 27

Cage Rage 27 was an event held on July 12, 2008 at Wembley Arena in London, United Kingdom.

Results

Cage Rage 28

Cage Rage 28 was an event held on September 20, 2008 at The Troxy in London, United Kingdom.

Results

Cage Rage UK - Fighting Hurts Final

Cage Rage UK - Fighting Hurts Final was an event held on November 1, 2008 at The Troxy in London, United Kingdom.

Results

See also 
 Cage Rage Championships
 List of Cage Rage champions
 List of Cage Rage events

References

Cage Rage Championships events
2008 in mixed martial arts